The 1940 Kettering by-election was a parliamentary by-election held on 6 March 1940 for the British House of Commons constituency of Kettering in Northamptonshire.

Previous MP 
The seat had become vacant when the constituency's Conservative Member of Parliament (MP), John Eastwood, resigned his seat following his appointment as a Metropolitan Police magistrate. He had been Kettering's MP since the 1931 general election, when he defeated the sitting Labour MP Samuel Perry.

Candidates 
The Conservative candidate was John Profumo, a British Army officer and son of a prominent barrister of Italian origin.

During the Second World War unopposed by-elections were common, since the major parties had agreed not to contest by-elections when vacancies arose in seats held by the other parties; contests occurred only when independent candidates or minor parties chose to stand. However, William Ross, a local steelworker and Labour Party councillor in Corby, wanted to contest the seat. He was disowned by his local Labour Party and by the party's National Executive Committee, and stood as a "Workers' and Pensioners' Anti-War" candidate.

Result 
On a turnout barely half of that at the 1935 general election, Profumo held the seat comfortably, with 73% of the votes. After a successful career in the army (where he rose to the rank of Brigadier and was awarded an OBE), he was defeated at the 1945 general election. He returned to Parliament in 1950, and rose to become Secretary of State for War in 1960, before his career was destroyed in 1963 by a political scandal which became known as the Profumo affair.

Votes

See also
 Kettering constituency
 Kettering
 Lists of United Kingdom by-elections
 United Kingdom by-election records

References

 
 

1940 elections in the United Kingdom
1940 in England
20th century in Northamptonshire
1940
By-elections to the Parliament of the United Kingdom in Northamptonshire constituencies
March 1940 events